The Melville Island oil sands are a large deposit of oil sands (sometimes referred to as tar sands) on Melville Island in the Canadian Arctic Archipelago.

Exploration for petroleum deposits in the Canadian Arctic Archipelago began, on Melville Island, in 1961.
Oil sands deposits were found in the Marie Bay region in 1962, and other locations that are part of the Bjorne Formation.

See also
 Athabasca oil sands
 Peace River oil sands
 Cold Lake oil sands
 Wabasca oil sands

References

Bituminous sands of Canada